Nick Knight is a 1989 American television film about Nick Knight, a centuries-old vampire working as a police detective in modern-day Los Angeles.

Originally meant to be a pilot episode for a television series, it was not picked up at the time. However, in 1992, CBS picked up the series but produced the show in Canada as Forever Knight, re-filming the pilot (with the same plot) and using a completely different cast, except for John Kapelos.

Cast
 Rick Springfield as Nick Knight
 John Kapelos as Don Schanke
 Robert Harper as Dr. Jack Brittington
 Richard Fancy as Capt. Brunetti
 Laura Johnson as Dr. Alyce Hunter
 Craig Richard Nelson as Fenner
 Fran Ryan as Jeannie
 Cec Verrell as Janette
 Jack Murdock as Topper
 Michael Nader as Lacroix
 Irene Miracle as The Nurse
  Gregory Wagrowski as Detective Jessell 
 Davis Roberts as Dr. Dave 
  Al Fann  as Dedrick

See also
Vampire film
List of vampire television series

References

External links
 
 

1989 films
1989 television films
American television films
Forever Knight
American vampire films
Television films as pilots
1989 horror films
1980s English-language films
1980s American films